Eureka is a city located in St. Louis County, Missouri, United States, adjacent to the cities of Wildwood and Pacific, along Interstate 44. It is in the extreme southwest of the Greater St. Louis metro area. As of the 2020 census, the city had a population of 11,646. Since 1971, Eureka has been known as the home of the amusement park Six Flags St. Louis.

History

The area's first known inhabitants were Shawnee Native Americans on the banks of the Meramec river; archaeological artifacts can still be found today as evidence of their past occupation of the area.

The village of Eureka was platted in 1858 along the route of the Pacific Railroad. By 1890, the village consisted of about 100 homes. According to the Eureka, railroad workers, while clearing the way for the track and the next railroad camp, saw Eureka, level land with little to clear, and declared, "Eureka!" Greek meaning "I have found it." Thus, Eureka was founded. In 1898, Eureka became home to the St. Louis Children's Industrial Farm, established to give children from St. Louis tenement neighborhoods a chance to experience life in a rural setting. It later became Camp Wyman (now part of Wyman Center) and is one of the oldest camps in the United States. The first high school class in Eureka was held in 1909. Eureka was incorporated as a fourth-class city on April 7, 1954.

City of Allenton
The railroad town of Allenton is a former community on U.S. Route 66 located (now) at the junction of Interstate 44 and Business Loop 44 in western St. Louis County. In 1985, it was annexed by the city of Eureka. The town is currently rural, with adjacent farmland and forested Ozark ridges. This community was declared blighted by St. Louis County in 1973.

Geography

Floods 

The city of Eureka has suffered multiple floods, the two most catastrophic being in 2015 and 2017. This caused the city and U.S. Army Corps of Engineers to evaluate a dozen strategic options, from the use of levees and walls, to buyouts of high-risk properties, to the restoration of flood plain as water storage. Scientific researchers determined that the flooding was a man-made calamity caused in part by “inaccurate Federal Emergency Management Agency flood frequencies based on the assumption that today’s river will behave as it has in the past greatly underestimating our real flood risk and leading to inappropriate development in floodways and floodplains.”

2015 
The december 2015 North American storm complex deeply impacted the state of Missouri with heavy rain and snow causing severe floods. The storm system was responsible for heavy rain that caused severe flooding. In Eureka, more than 100 boat rescues were conducted by Eureka Fire Department of people and several pets from the second stories of homes near the Meramec River.

2017 
A flooding event caused by a strong spring storm system brought multiple rounds of thunderstorms and heavy rain to portions of the Midwest the weekend of April 29th-30th, 2017. The middle portion of the Mississippi approached historical record flooding. The National Weather Service anticipated a 48.5 ft. crest at Cape Girardeau, Missouri on May 5, 2017, which was within 6 inches of the January 2, 2016 crest of 48.86 ft. The first floor of a church flooded with about 48 inches of water, the same amount as in December 2015. Floodwater from the Meramec River covered athletic fields at Eureka High School, encroached on the school's buildings, and ruined the gymnasium floor.

Demographics

2010 census
As of the 2010 census, there were 10,189 people, 3,474 households, and 2,758 families residing in the city. The racial makeup of the city was 94.9% White, 0.8% African American, 0.2% Native American, 1.9% Asian, 0.1% Pacific Islander, 0.3% from other races, and 1.7% from two or more races. Hispanic or Latino of any race were 2.0% of the population.

There were 3,474 households, of which 46.9% had children under the age of 18 living with them, 66.2% were married couples living together, 9.3% had a female householder with no husband present, 3.9% had a male householder with no wife present, and 20.6% were non-families. 17.2% of all households were made up of individuals, and 5.9% had someone living alone who was 65 years of age or older. The average household size was 2.87 and the average family size was 3.27.

The median age in the city was 37.1 years. 30.9% of residents were under the age of 18; 6% were between the ages of 18 and 24; 26.6% were from 25 to 44; 26.7% were from 45 to 64, and 9.6% were 65 years of age or older. The gender makeup of the city was 49.6% male and 50.4% female.

2000 census
As of the 2000 census, there were 7,676 people in the city, organized into 2,487 households and two families. The racial makeup of the city was 97.38% White, 0.82% Asian, 0.57% Black or African American, 0.20% Native American, no Pacific Islanders, 0.26% from other races, and 0.77% from two or more races. 1.22% of the population were Hispanic or Latino of any race.

There were 2,487 households, out of which half have children under the age of 18 living with them, 71.6% were married couples living together, 8.2% had a female householder with no husband present, and 17.0% were non-families. 13.8% of all households were made up of individuals, and 4.3% had someone living alone who was 65 years of age or older. The average household size was 2.98 and the average family size was 3.30.

In the city, the population was spread out, with 31.9% under the age of 18, 5.7% from 18 to 24, 34.4% from 25 to 44, 19.5% from 45 to 64, and 8.5% 65 years of age or older. The median age was 34 years. For every 100 females, there were 94.9 males. For every 100 females age 18 and over, there were 89.6 males.

The median income for a household in the city was $74,301, and the median income for a family was $80,625. Males had a median income of $51,799 compared to $33,269 for females. The per capita income for the city was $27,553. 2.2% of the population and 1.3% of families were below the poverty line. Out of the total population, 3.1% of those under the age of 18 and 5.9% of those 65 and older were living below the poverty line.

Education

Rockwood R-Vi School District operates 3 elementary schools, Lasalle Springs Middle School and Eureka High School.

The city also contains two private schools, St. Mark's Lutheran Church and School and Most Sacred Heart Church and School.

The city has the Eureka Hills Branch lending library, a branch of the St. Louis County Library. It was moved to a newly built location that opened on June 2, 2021.

News media
Local news coverage for the town and some of its neighbors is provided by the Tri County Journal, the Eureka and Pacific Current NewsMagazine, and the Washington Missourian.

Notable people
 Bob Klinger, Major League Baseball player
 Rissi Palmer, Country Western singer
 Cam Janssen, National Hockey League player
 Maurice Alexander (American Football), NFL player and older brother of Hassan Haskins, University of Michigan running back
Clayton Echard (Star of The Bachelor Season 26).

References

External links
City of Eureka official website
Eureka Chamber of Commerce

Cities in St. Louis County, Missouri
Cities in Missouri